Gordon Robertson (15 February 1909 – 4 September 1983) was a New Zealand cricketer. He played eleven first-class matches for Otago between 1937 and 1941.

See also
 List of Otago representative cricketers

References

External links
 

1909 births
1983 deaths
New Zealand cricketers
Otago cricketers
Cricketers from Gisborne, New Zealand